Stony Lake is located east of Sperryville, New York. It is a private lake w/ no public access. The outlet creek of the lake flows into Beaver Meadow Creek. Fish species present in the lake are smallmouth bass, rock bass, pickerel, Blue Gills, Large Mouth Bass, and sunfish.

References

Lakes of New York (state)
Lakes of Lewis County, New York